Frankie J. Moore is the Chief Judge of the Nebraska Court of Appeals. She was appointed by Mike Johanns.

Education

Moore earned her Bachelor of Arts from Nebraska Wesleyan University in 1980 and her Juris Doctor from the University of Nebraska College of Law in 1983.

Legal career

Moore began her legal career in 1983 as an attorney in private practice in North Platte, Nebraska. She was in private practice until she joined the Nebraska Court of Appeals in 2000.

Nebraska Court of Appeals service

She was appointed to the Court of Appeals by Republican Governor Mike Johanns and joined the court on January 28, 2000. Moore became chief judge in 2014.

References

External links

Official Biography on Nebraska Judicial Branch website

Living people
20th-century American lawyers
21st-century American judges
Nebraska lawyers
Nebraska Wesleyan University alumni
University of Nebraska alumni
Year of birth missing (living people)
20th-century American women lawyers
21st-century American women judges